Omprakash Babarao Kadu is an independent Member of the Legislative Assembly from Achalpur, Maharashtra, India. Achalpur assembly constituency is a part of Amravati (Lok Sabha constituency). He has been elected to Maharashtra Legislative Assembly for four consecutive terms from 2004 to 2019. He is currently serving jail for two-years term in a case against him.

Career
On 19 October 2014, Kadu won the assembly election, defeating congress candidate Bablu Deshmukh  candidate by more than 10000 votes. This was the first time in Achalpur assembly elections that a candidate won three times in succession. In 2019 election he won the assembly election by total of 81,252 votes which 44% of the total voters. He is the first candidate to be elected for a fourth consecutive term in Achalpur Assembly elections. He is Leader of Prahar Janshakti Party. He is part of Newly formed MahaVikas Aaghadi or MVA. the banner called Prahar Yuvashakti Sanghatana that became the Prahar Party.He then rebelled against MVA along with Eknath Shinde in 2022 Maharashtra political crisis.

On March 2023, He sparked controversy when he said street to be send to Assam to be eaten for dog meat.

On 22 April 2017, Punjab Bharatiya Janata Party MP Hema Malini said she would take action against Kadu for making derogatory comments towards Malini days earlier.

Positions held
 1997: Elected as member of Panchayat Samiti
 1997: Elected as Chandurbazar Panchayat Samiti
 2004: Elected to Maharashtra Legislative Assembly (1st term)
 2009: Re-elected to Maharashtra Legislative Assembly (2nd term)
 2014: Re-elected to Maharashtra Legislative Assembly (3rd term)
 2019: Re-elected to Maharashtra Legislative Assembly (4th term)
 2019: Swear in as minister of state in Udhav Thackeray Government.
 2019: Appointed as minister of state for Water Resources (Irrigation) & Command Area Development, School Education, Woman & Child Development, Labour, OBC-SEBC-SBC-VJNT Welfare
 2020: Appointed as guardian minister of Akola district

See also
Uddhav Thackeray ministry

External links
MLA Award For Bacchu Kadu
Government officer beat by MLA due to Corruptipon
Times Story
Bacchu Kadu Passport
Winter Session news bacchu Kadu

References

Living people
Marathi politicians
Maharashtra MLAs 2004–2009
Maharashtra MLAs 2009–2014
Independent politicians in India
Maharashtra MLAs 2014–2019
People from Amravati district
Prahar Janshakti Party politicians
1970 births